Jane Stuart (c. 1654 – 1742), was a Quaker who lived and died in Wisbech, England. There is a long-standing tradition that she was a natural daughter of James II of England.

No records of her during her life in the town have been located in the Wisbech & Fenland Museum that confirm the Stuart royal link; it was only after her death that the details of her life were recorded in oral histories of Wisbech residents.

Biography 
Stuart's father, James II of England, was an English prince in exile in France following the execution of his father, Charles I when she was born. The surname of Stuart's mother is not known, it is claimed that Jane let slip her mother's name as Alice. James returned to England, bringing Jane Stuart with him, when she was about six years old.

She was raised at court. Stuart was once engaged, but her bridegroom was killed in an accident when their coach overturned on their wedding day. At one point, she was imprisoned with Quaker theologian Thomas Elwood. She left court for a life in keeping with her values as a Quaker around age 34, when her father, by then king, was exiled to France. She left in disguise, perhaps in Quaker's dress, and went north, ending in Wisbech, working first in fields and then as a spinner. Wisbech Castle had formerly been used for religious prisoners, both Catholic and Protestant and later a Quaker, John Inds was taken from a peaceable meeting on 16 February 1663 and imprisoned for three years in Wisbech Gaol.
It was said that Stuart reaped and worked in gardens in the summer and did knitting and sewing in the winter. She is reputed to have lived and spun in the basement of a property on the Old Market.

She once travelled to Scotland to see her much-younger brother, James Francis Edward Stuart, Prince of Wales, also known as the Old Pretender. Later in life, Stuart was sought out by the Duke of Argyll; she recognized his coach and hid, perhaps thinking he was seeking her out to be a political pawn. It is said that Stuart preferred her simple life to that of one at court and claimed she would not give it up to be Queen of England.

The meeting house Stuart attended (and where she is buried) was a thatched building on the North Brink, as shown in a watercolour painting by Algernon Peckover and in use by the Friends from 1711. She died at the age of 88 on 12 July 1742.
She is referred to in the Victoria County History. She is supposed to have had all her teeth at the time of her death.

Legacy
The story of Stuart's life was the basis of a novel The Royal Quaker (Methuen) by Mrs Bertram Tanqueray, wife of a clergyman of Coldham, near Wisbech.  Stuart appears as a character in Elfrida Vipon's novel Bed In Hell.

Gravesite 
An earlier burial-ground, situated in the adjacent Parish of Walsoken, Norfolk still belonged to the Society of Friends but had not been used since 1711 when the new meeting room was converted from two cottages.
Her final resting place is in the new burial ground behind the Friends Meeting House on the North Brink.

The graves at that time were unmarked. Stuart's was marked by box (Buxus sempervirens) hedging. Stuart's grave is stated as "exhibiting the initials 'J.S.' with the words and figures 'aged 88. 1742' and is supposed to record the sepulture of one of the descendants of the royal family of Stuarts" in The History of Wisbech published by William Watts in 1834. Box hedging remains around Stuart's grave. Today it forms the shape of a rectangle enclosing 'JS, AGE, 88, 1742' although in the past a drawing by Algernon Peckover showed it as forming "JS, aged 88, 1742" over the centuries parts appear to have required replanting. A recent photo of the box hedging is on The Friend website  however the planting does not match the planting in a much older black and white photograph in the National Trust's Peckover House collection online, notably the '7' and the '4'. 
When the British Archaeological Congress took place in Wisbech 1878, Mr Jonathan Peckover took members on a tour of the site and stated that the hedging had been periodically renewed.
The travel writer James Hooper was shown around the Friends Meeting House and Burying Ground by Alexander Peckover in 1897, later in his newspaper article he notes 'the headstone inscription - Jane Stuart Died 1742 Aged 88' and 'this highly accomplished woman once fainted in the God's Acre of the peace-loving Friends, and under the turfy spot on which she fell lie her remains'.

References

Notes

Further reading 

1650s births
1742 deaths
English Quakers
Illegitimate children of James II of England
People from Wisbech